Omm ol Balabil (also Romanized as Omm ol Balābīl; also known as Maraga, Ommé Balabil, and Umm ul Balēbīl) is a village in Veys Rural District, Veys District, Bavi County, Khuzestan Province, Iran. At the 2006 census, its population was 194, in 19 families.

References 

Populated places in Bavi County